

Current
Angelo Brocato's
Antoine's
Arnaud's
Breads On Oak
Brennan Family Restaurants
Brennan's
Broussard's
Café du Monde
Café Reconcile
Camellia Grill
Central Grocery
Clancy's
Commander's Palace
Dickie Brennan's Steakhouse
Domilise's Restaurant
Dong Phuong Oriental Bakery
Dooky Chase’s Restaurant
Galatoire's
Hansen's Sno-Bliz
Morning Call Coffee Stand
Mr. B's Bistro
Pat O'Brien's Bar
Pêche Seafood Grill
La Petite Grocery
Ruth's Chris Steak House
Snug Harbor (jazz club)
Willie Mae's Scotch House

Defunct
Creole Kosher Kitchen
K-Paul's Louisiana Kitchen,
Upperline Restaurant

References

Restaurants in New Orleans